Mai Sukhan (died 1824), was an Majhail ruler of Misl. Mai Sukhan gained recognition in Punjab for her military leadership.
Mai Sukhan was a powerful Sikh ruler of the Majha region, which gained her recognition throughout Punjab.

She was the widow of the Sikh leader Sardar Gulab Singh Bhangi, a Dhillon Jatt of Panjwar village, who had died in 1800 at Bhasin village now in Lahore District.  The rulers of the Misl were the Jatts of Dhillon Clan who had ruled from mid 1750s to 1805. 

In 1805, when the forces of the Lahore-based Sikh emperor Ranjit Singh were in the midst of the conquest of the holy city of Amritsar, the Sikh band of defenders under the command of Mai Sukhan Dhillon held them off for a considerable period. When requested to surrender the gun Zamzama by Ranjit Singh, Mai Sukhan sealed the city and prepared to defend it. The emperor afterwards recognized her bravery by giving her five or six villages.

She had a son named Gurdit Singh Dhillon, aged ten when his father Gulab Singh died. She died in 1824.

References

Indian female royalty
Military history of India
Punjabi people
History of Sikhism
Female Sikh warriors
Women in 19th-century warfare
18th-century births
1824 deaths
Place of birth unknown
Place of death unknown
18th-century Indian women
18th-century Indian people
19th-century Indian women
19th-century Indian people